Ali Thani Juma'a Al-Ehawi (born 18 August 1968) is an Emirati former professional footballer who played as a midfielder for Sharjah FC and the United Arab Emirates national team. He scored a headed goal against Yugoslavia national team in the 1990 FIFA World Cup.

External links
 
 
 
 

1968 births
Living people
Emirati footballers
Association football midfielders
United Arab Emirates international footballers
Asian Games competitors for the United Arab Emirates
Footballers at the 1994 Asian Games
1988 AFC Asian Cup players
1990 FIFA World Cup players
UAE Pro League players
Sharjah FC players